Robert Pizani (26 April 1896 – 17 June 1965) was a French stage and film actor whose 45-year career encompassed leading roles in numerous plays, revues and operettas as well as dozens of films.

In operetta
Pizani's roles in operetta and musical theatre include:
Amants légitimes by Fernand Mallet (1924) Théâtre de l'Étoile, as Le Comte de Puyssec (world premiere)
Monsieur Beaucaire by André Messager (1925)  Théâtre Marigny, as Nash (French premiere)
Pouche by Henri Hirschmann (1925) Théâtre de l'Étoile, as Alfred (world premiere)
La Teresina by Oscar Straus (1928) Théâtre des Folies-Wagram, as Prince Borghese (premiere of French version)
Tip-Toes by George Gershwin (1929) Théâtre des Folies-Wagram, as Oncle Puff (French premiere)
Brummell by Reynaldo Hahn (1931) Théâtre des Folies-Wagram, as Beau Brummell (world premiere)
Les Petites Cardinal by Arthur Honegger and Jacques Ibert (1938) Théâtre des Bouffes-Parisiens, as Le Marquis de Cavalcanti (world premiere)
Leurs majestés by Hans Lang (1939) Théâtre Pigalle, as Ministre Chrystoforidis (French premiere)

Filmography
Pizani's film roles include:

Un gentleman neurasthénique (1924)
La grande amie (1927) as L'imitateur de Grock 
 (1929)
My Aunt from Honfleur (1931)
La chauve-souris (1932)
Une nuit au paradis (1932) as Alain Harris
Azaïs (1932) as Stromboli
Le petit écart (1932) as Pianiste
Les amours de Pergolèse (1933) as Nicolas d'Arcangioli
T'amerò sempre (1933) as Oscar, il parruchiere
Je vous aimerai toujours (1933) as Oscar
 Bal Tabarin (1933) as Le danseur
Le supplice de Tantale (1933)
Miss Helyett (1933) as Bacarel
Une fois dans la vie (1934) as Gallivert
The Midnight Prince (1934) as Le comte Maritza
L'auberge du Petit-Dragon (1934) as Le cabot
Les hommes de la côte (1934)
Le malade imaginaire (1934) as Thomas Diafoirus
Le billet de mille (1935) as Un professeur qui joue aux courses
Coup de vent (1936)
Rigolboche (1936) as Lecor, le croupier
Les petites alliées (1936) as Lohéac
L'homme du jour (1937) as Le poète efféminé
La loupiote (1937) as Maxime
La pocharde (1937) as Moëb
La reine des resquilleuses (1937)
L'amour veille (1937) as Carteret
The Pearls of the Crown (1937) as Talleyrand
Hercule (1938) as Le premier frère Riquel
Café de Paris (1938) as L'auteur dramatique
Alerte en Méditerranée (1938) as Le médecin du port
Entrée des artistes (1938) as Jérome
Monsieur Coccinelle (1938) as Illusio
 (1938) as Richard Wagner / Jacques Offenbach / Olivier Métra
Blood Red Rose (1939)
La boutique aux illusions (1939) as Le spectateur
Entente cordiale (1939) as Paul Cambon
La belle revanche (1939) as Casimir Bouchot
Jeunes filles en détresse (1939) as Monsieur Tarrand
Paradis perdu (1940) as Le couturier Bernard Lesage
Le président Haudecoeur (1940) as L'abbé Margot
Face au destin (1940) as Le couturier
Béatrice devant le désir (1944) as Alfred
Les Petites du quai aux fleurs (1944) as Un médecin
Coup de tête (1944) as Le maître d'hôtel (uncredited)
Box of Dreams (1945) as Oncle André
Quartier chinois (1947) as Le chef de la police
Le Silence est d'or (1947) as M. Duperrier
L'éventail (1947) as Le consul Alvaro Gomez
 Mandrin (1947) as Voltaire
Une grande fille toute simple (1948) as Etienne
Le dolmen tragique (1948) as Châtelard
The Cupboard Was Bare (1948) as Le médecin
 The Woman I Murdered (1948) as Arthur de Selve
Drame au Vel'd'Hiv''' (1949) as SternRome Express (1950) as CornagliaPrélude à la gloire (1950) as FloriotTête blonde (1950) as MartinLe plus joli péché du monde (1951) as Clément LebretonUne fille sur la route (1952) as Michel de Romeuil
 The Nude Dancer (1952) as GrégorJ'y suis... j'y reste (1953) as Le Cardinal de TramoneLes révoltés de Lomanach (1954) as PhilippeDeadlier Than the Male (1956) as Le PrésidentFernandel the Dressmaker (1956) as Le BaronIt Happened in Aden (1956) as Hubert RobertLes carottes sont cuites (1956)
 Paris, Palace Hotel (1956) as Georges - le maître d'hôtel du palaceFolies Bergère (1956) as ClairvalHonoré de Marseille (1956) as BaccalaLe grand bluff (1957) (uncredited)Sénéchal the Magnificent (1957) as Le prince AlexandreLa Parisienne (1957) as Ambassador MouchkinePremier mai (1958) as Saint-BertinLa Violetera (1958) as MaestroBoulevard (1960) as PauloLe Capitaine Fracasse (1961) as BlaziusLe petit garçon de l'ascenseur (1962) (final film role)

References

External links
Lardan, Claude (22 March 1935). "Pizani le plus parisien des artistes". L'Européen'', p. 15 

1896 births
1965 deaths
Male actors from Paris
French male stage actors
French male musical theatre actors
French male film actors
French male silent film actors
20th-century French male actors
20th-century French male singers